Falu red or falun red is a permeable red paint commonly used on wooden cottages and barns in Sweden, Finland, and Norway.

History 

Following hundreds of years of mining in Falun, large piles of residual product were deposited above ground in the vicinity of the mines.

By the 16th Century, mineralization of the mine's tailings and slag added by smelters began to produce a red-coloured sludge rich in copper, limonite, silicic acid, and zinc. When the sludge was heated for a few hours and then mixed with linseed oil and rye flour, it was found to form an excellent anti-weathering paint. During the 17th century, falu red began to be daubed onto wooden buildings to mimic the red-brick façades built by the upper classes.

In Sweden's built-up areas, wooden buildings were often painted with falu red until the early 19th century, until authorities began to oppose use of the paint.

Resurgence 

Falu red saw a resurgence in popularity in the Swedish countryside during the 19th century, when poorer farmers and crofters began to paint their houses. Falu red is still widely used in the countryside. The Finnish expression punainen tupa ja perunamaa, "a red cottage and a potato patch", referring to idyllic home and life, is a direct allusion to a country house painted in falu red.

Composition 
The paint consists of water, rye flour, linseed oil, silicates, iron oxides, copper compounds, and zinc. As falu red ages the binder deteriorates, leaving the color granules loose, but restoration is easy since simply brushing the surface is sufficient before repainting.

The actual color may be different depending on the degree to which the oxide is burnt, ranging from almost black to a bright, light red. Different tones of red have been popular at different times.

References

External links

Mould resistance tests in Sweden (falu on page 5, in Swedish)

Dalarna
Shades of brown
Shades of red